Tarsorrhaphy is a surgical procedure in which the eyelids are partially sewn together to narrow the eyelid opening.
It may be done to protect the cornea in cases of corneal exposure, as a treatment for Graves' ophthalmopathy, Möbius syndrome or after corneal graft surgery. The procedure is performed on the corner of the eyelid opening.

See also
 Eye surgery
 Keratoconjunctivitis sicca

References

External links
 Surgery Encyclopedia: Tarsorrhaphy

Oculoplastic surgery